Kandrian Coastal Rural LLG is a local-level government (LLG) of West New Britain Province, Papua New Guinea.

Wards
01. Amnge
02. Apalik
03. Aeglep
04. Kandrian
05. Kaul
06. Loko Nambis
07. Ioudo
08. Vinum
09. Pilolo
10. Agulo
11. Ivangnga
12. Naplavui
81. Kandrian Urban

References

Local-level governments of West New Britain Province